Garland Hare "Bulldog" Williams (August 21, 1921 – April 7, 1989) was an American football player who played at the tackle position on both offense and defense. He played college football for Duke and Georgia and professional football for the Brooklyn Dodgers in 1947 and 1948 and the Chicago Hornets in 1949.

Early years
Williams was born in 1921 in Parkin, Arkansas. He attended Forrest City High School in Arkansas.

College football and military service
Williams played college football at Duke and Georgia. He also served in the United States Marine Corps during World War II.

Professional football
He was drafted by the Brooklyn Dodgers in the seventh round (51st overall pick) of the 1947 AAFC Draft. He played for the Dodgers during their 1947 and 1948 seasons, appearing in a total of 26 games. He also appeared in one game for the Chicago Hornets in 1949.

Later years
In 1989, Williams died at age 67 after a heart attack at Alpharetta, Georgia.

References

1921 births
1989 deaths
Brooklyn Dodgers (AAFC) players
Chicago Hornets players
Duke Blue Devils football players
Georgia Bulldogs football players
Players of American football from Arkansas
People from Parkin, Arkansas